The Sunfish class competition of the sailing events at the 2011 Pan American Games in Guadalajara were held from October 17 to October 23 at the Vallarta Yacht Club in Puerto Vallarta. The defending champion was Eduardo Cudero of Venezuela.

Points were assigned based on the finishing position in each race (1 for first, 2 for second, etc.). The points were totaled from the top 9 results of the first 10 races, with lower totals being better. If a sailor was disqualified or did not complete the race, 8 points were assigned for that race (as there were 7 sailors in this competition). The top 5 sailors at that point competed in the final race, with placings counting double for final score. The sailor with the lowest total score won.

Schedule
All times are Central Standard Time (UTC-6).

Results

Race M is the medal race in which only the top 5 competitors took part. Each boat can drop its lowest result provided that all ten races are completed.  If less than ten races are completed all races will count.  Boats cannot drop their result in the medal race.

References

External links
Sailing schedule

Sailing at the 2011 Pan American Games
Sunfish competitions